"Signed Sealed and Delivered" is a song by Cowboy Copas (co-credited to Lois Mann). Copas recorded a hit version for King Records, which reached number two on the Most Played Juke Box Folk Records chart in 1948. Copas re-recorded the song in 1961 for Starday Records, in Stereophonic Sound, and with a more modern (for the times) style. This version also charted, reaching number 10 on the Hot C&W Sides chart.

Cover versions
 In 1961, Rusty Draper recorded a version that peaked at number 20 on the Easy Listening chart, and number 91 on the Hot 100.
 In 1963, James Brown and the Famous Flames recorded an R&B cover version, which charted at number 77 on the Pop chart. Brown and the Famous Flames also performed the song on the 1964 live album Pure Dynamite! Live at the Royal.
 Other performers who covered the song include Hank Thompson, Hank Locklin, and Lefty Frizzell.

References

Cowboy Copas songs
James Brown songs
The Famous Flames songs
Hank Thompson (musician) songs
Lefty Frizzell songs
Jimmy Wakely songs
Songs written by Cowboy Copas
1948 songs
1948 singles
1963 singles
Songs written by Syd Nathan
King Records (United States) singles